Fodhla Cronin O'Reilly is an Irish film producer. She is best known for producing Lady Macbeth starring Florence Pugh and Ammonite starring Kate Winslet and Saoirse Ronan. She has been nominated for one Academy Award for her short film, Head Over Heels and two BAFTA Awards for her debut feature, Lady Macbeth.

Cronin O'Reilly grew up in County Kerry, Ireland where she attended The Killorglin Intermediate School. She studied Film Theory & Video Production at the University of West London where she graduated in 2008. She later attended the National Film & Television School in Beaconsfield, UK, where she graduated in 2012 with an MA in Producing for Film & Television.

Filmography 
 God's Creatures (2022)
 Ammonite (2020)
 Lady Macbeth (2016)
 Head Over Heels (2012)

External links
 

Irish film producers
Year of birth missing (living people)
Living people
Irish women film producers